Brianna Decker (born May 13, 1991) is an American former professional ice hockey forward who played for the Wisconsin Badgers, Boston Blades, Boston Pride, Calgary Inferno, Professional Women's Hockey Players Association, and United States women's national ice hockey team. She won the 2012 Patty Kazmaier Award while playing for the University of Wisconsin, recognizing the best female ice hockey player in NCAA Division I play. With the Boston Pride, Decker would score the first hat trick in NWHL history on October 25, 2015.

Playing career

NCAA
In her freshman season (2009–10) with the Wisconsin Badgers women's ice hockey program, Decker scored the Badgers' first goal of the season in a game against North Dakota (October 3). During the season, she accumulated seven multi-point games and four multi-goal games. She was third in team scoring despite missing almost half of the first part of the season. On September 25, 2011, Decker scored her third career hat trick in a 13–0 defeat of the Lindenwood Lady Lions ice hockey program. Her 12-game winning goals during the 2010–11 season are a program record. She holds the Badgers' longest scoring streak at 32 games (February 11, 2011 to January 6, 2012). She accumulated 77 points (33 goals, 44 assists) during the streak. In her junior season, Decker won the 2012 Patty Kazmaier Award.

USA Hockey
She won gold at the 2009 IIHF World Women's U18 Championship. On January 28, 2011, it was announced that Decker was named to the preliminary roster for the US Women's National Team. From April 4 to 12, 2011, she was one of 30 players that took part in a selection/training camp and was named to the final roster that participated at the 2011 IIHF Women's World Championship. At the 2011 IIHF Women's World Championship, Brianna Decker was among the tournament's top five scorers. Decker's 11 points (four goals, seven assists) placed her second.

In 2017, Decker was a member of the winning US team for the 2017 IIHF Women's World Championship, receiving two assists in the final against Canada.

On January 2, 2022, Decker was named to Team USA's roster to represent the United States at the 2022 Winter Olympics after having been a top scorer for the team at the two previous Olympic Games and earning a silver (2014) and gold medal (2018).

In the opening preliminary round 5-2 victory over Finland on February 3, Decker suffered a knee injury in the middle of the first period and was ruled out of the Olympics. Decker announced her retirement from USA Hockey on March 2, 2023. She finished her career with 81 goals and 170 points in 147 games, and was fourth in IIHF Women's World Championship all-time scoring with 68 points.

Professional

CWHL
Making her debut for the Boston Blades on January 17, 2015, Decker accumulated seven points (three goals, four assists) in an 11–3 win against the Brampton Thunder. Decker would finish the season leading all American-born players in scoring while ranking second overall in the scoring race for the Angela James Bowl with 32 points. In addition, she tied with Blades teammate Tara Watchorn as the league leader in plus/minus rating with a +25. During the 2015 Clarkson Cup playoffs, Decker led all players in scoring while registering two goals in the championship game, a 3–2 overtime win over the Montreal Stars.

NWHL
Signing as a free agent with the Boston Pride of the National Women's Hockey League, Decker made league history on October 25, 2015. During a 5–3 road win against the Buffalo Beauts, Decker would score the first hat trick in league history. All three goals were scored against Beauts goaltender Brianne McLaughlin.

Decker was awarded Most Valuable Player consecutively by the NWHL for her performance in the 2015–16 season and 2016–17 season.

Return to CWHL
On July 24, 2018, Decker and fellow Team USA gold medalist Kacey Bellamy signed as free agents with the Calgary Inferno. Decker would score the game-winning goal versus Les Canadiennes de Montreal in the 2019 Clarkson Cup finals, with Bellamy gaining the assist. Of note, Decker would also be recognized as the MVP of the 2019 Clarkson Cup playoffs.

NHL
On January 25, 2019, Decker participated in the NHL All-Star Skills Competition, where she demonstrated the premier passing drill event. Her demo time of 1:06 was faster than all eight men who competed in the event. The $25,000 prize money went to Leon Draisaitl, who finished at 1:09. Ice hockey equipment manufacturer CCM announced that it would pay Decker $25,000 for achieving the fastest time.

PWHPA
Decker participated in the #ForTheGame movement in connection with the PWHPA, beginning in May 2019. She played for Team Johnston in PWHPA's Dream Gap exhibition tour.

Skating for Team New Hampshire during the 2020–21 PWHPA season, Decker participated in a PWHPA Dream Gap Tour event at New York's Madison Square Garden on February 28, 2021, the first women's ice hockey event at the venue. Playing for a team sponsored by the Women's Sports Foundation, Decker recorded two goals and two assists in a 4-3 win, earning the First Star of the Game.

Career statistics

NCAA

WCHA

CWHL

NWHL

Awards and honors

NCAA
Patty Kazmaier Memorial Award winner (2012)
RBK Hockey/AHCA Division I second-team All-American (2010–11)
All-WCHA First Team (2010–11)
WCHA Final Face-off Most Valuable Player (2010–11)
All-WCHA Rookie Team (2009–10)
three-time WCHA Rookie of the Week (2009–10)
WCHA Preseason Rookie of the Year (2009–10)
Badgers Rookie of the Year (2009–10)
 All-WCHA Academic Team (2010–11)
WCHA Rookie of the Week (Week of October 5, 2009)
 2012 Wisconsin Offensive Player of the Year Award

CWHL
CWHL co-leader, Plus-Minus rating +25 (2014–15)
CWHL Scoring Leader among American-born players (2014–15)
2015 CWHL Rookie of the Year Award Winner
2019 Clarkson Cup Playoff MVP

IIHF
Inductee into the 2014 Winter Olympics for the US team

NWHL
Isobel Cup Playoffs Most Valuable Player Award (2016)
NWHL Most Valuable Player Award (2016)

References

External links

Brianna Decker at USA Hockey

1991 births
Living people
American expatriate ice hockey players in Canada
American women's ice hockey forwards
Boston Blades players
Boston Pride players
Calgary Inferno players
Clarkson Cup champions
Ice hockey players from Wisconsin
Ice hockey players at the 2014 Winter Olympics
Ice hockey players at the 2018 Winter Olympics
Ice hockey players at the 2022 Winter Olympics
Isobel Cup champions
Medalists at the 2014 Winter Olympics
Medalists at the 2018 Winter Olympics
Medalists at the 2022 Winter Olympics
Olympic gold medalists for the United States in ice hockey
Olympic silver medalists for the United States in ice hockey
Patty Kazmaier Award winners
People from Waukesha County, Wisconsin
Sportspeople from the Milwaukee metropolitan area
Wisconsin Badgers women's ice hockey players
Professional Women's Hockey Players Association players